Caucasus Line Cossack Host (Кавказское линейное казачье войско) was a Cossack host created in 1832 for the purpose of conquest of the Northern Caucasus. Together with the Black Sea Cossack Host, it defended the Caucasus Fortified Defense Line from the inlet of Terek River to the inlet of Kuban River.

It consisted of the following regiments:
Vladikavkaz regiment
Volga regiment
Gorsky (Mountain) regiment
Grebensky regiment
Caucasus regiment
Kizlyar regiment
Labinsky regiment
Mozdok regiment
Stavropol regiment
Sunzhen regiment
Terek regiment
Urup regiment
Khoper regiment

Cossack hosts